Menemerus semilimbatus is a spider in the family Salticidae.

Description
These fairly big jumping spiders are dorso-ventrally flattened and are covered with short dense, grayish-white hairs, with hairy whitish palps and a white band on the side margins of the carapace, showing also a small white, triangular marking in the middle. The eyes are large and forward-facing. The legs are light brown with darker rings and patches, while the abdomen is dorsally yellowish or grayish, with a characteristic pattern of several bright V-shaped markings. The females show a notch at the posterior edge of the epigyne and two oval depressions in the anterior half.

Distribution
Menemerus semilimbatus is a Mediterranean species widely distributed in Europe, southern Asia and in Africa. In the Americas, it has been reported for Argentina, Chile, Ecuador and USA.

Habitat
These spiders are synanthropic living in gardens and inside and on the outside of houses. It is usually found on the walls of buildings where it stalks its prey.

References

External links

 Eurospiders
 Salticidae

Spiders of Europe
Spiders of Asia
Spiders of South America
Salticidae
Spiders described in 1829
Taxa named by Carl Wilhelm Hahn